Jordan Wheeler (born 1964) is a Cree-Canadian writer. Along with numerous children's books, Wheeler has written scripts for the APTN and CBC. He's also received a Gemini Award for Best Writing in a Children's or Youth Program or Series for his work on renegadepress.com. 

He is a member of the George Gordon First Nation in Saskatchewan.

Publications 

 Brothers In Arms, published 1989 by Pemmican Publications 
 Adventure on Thunder Island with Edna King, published January 1, 1991 by James Lorimer Limited 
 Tapping the Gift: Manitoba's First People, published 1992 by Pemmican Publications
 All My Relations: An Anthology of Contemporary Canadian Native Fiction, published December 31, 1992 by University of Oklahoma Press 
 Just a Walk, illustrated by Christopher Auchter, published 1993 by Theytus Books
 Tortured People: The Politics of Colonization with Howard Adams, published 1992 by Theytus Books
 Christmas at Wapos Bay with Dennis Jackson, published October 17, 2005 by Coteau Books
 Chuck in the City, illustrated by Christopher Auchter, published January 1, 2009 by Theytus Books 
 The First Fry Bread: A Gitxsan Story with M. Jane Smith, illustrated by Ken N. Mowatt, published November 20, 2012 by FriesenPress 
 Digital Ogichida, published January 1, 2013 by Ningwakwe Learning Press 
 Boog the Bug, published August 24, 2015 by Pemmican Publications

Filmography

Awards

References 

 

Living people
1964 births
Writers from Winnipeg
Cree people
Indigenous writers of the Americas